Euglossa solangeae is a Euglossine bee species found in coastal southeastern Brazil. It is believed to be part of the Euglossa stellfeldi group.

References

Further reading
Ferrari, Bruno R., and Gabriel AR Melo. "Deceiving colors: recognition of color morphs as separate species in orchid bees is not supported by molecular evidence." Apidologie 45.5 (2014): 641–652.
Ferrari, Bruno Reganin. "Filogeografia de espécies de Euglossa (Hymenoptera, Apidae) da Mata Atlântica." (2012).
Nemésio, A. "The orchid-bee faunas (Hymenoptera: Apidae) of Reserva Ecológica Michelin, RPPN Serra Bonita and one Atlantic Forest remnant in the state of Bahia, Brazil, with new geographic records." Brazilian Journal of Biology 74.1 (2014): 16–22.

External links

solangeae
Endemic fauna of Brazil
Hymenoptera of South America
Hymenoptera of Brazil
Insects described in 2007
Orchid pollinators